Lyutovo is a village in the municipality of Belitsa, in Blagoevgrad Province, Bulgaria. It is located approximately 15 km east of Belitsa and 85.5 kilometres southeast from Sofia. As of 2010 it had a population of 242 people. The population is Muslim of pomak origin.

References

Villages in Blagoevgrad Province